Glaus is a surname. Notable people with the surname include:

 Gilbert Glaus (born 1955), Swiss road bicycle racer
 Troy Glaus (born 1976), American baseball player

See also
 Claus
 Summer Glau (born 1981), American actress